Lexington is a city in Anoka County, Minnesota, United States, and is a northern suburb of the Twin Cities metropolitan area.  The population was 2,049 at the 2010 census.

Geography

Lake Drive / County 23 serves as a main route in the community.  Other routes include Lexington Avenue and Lovell Road.  Interstate 35W passes near  the city.

The city of Lexington borders Blaine, Circle Pines, and Lino Lakes.  The landscape in the area is uniformly flat because the city sits entirely on the Anoka Sand Plain.

Public service
The city of Lexington is served by the Centennial Lakes Police Department, the Lexington Fire Department and the Centennial School District.

Demographics

2010 census
As of the census of 2010, there were 2,049 people, 787 households, and 519 families living in the city. The racial makeup of the city was 87.8% White, 2.7% African American, 1.1% Native American, 3.0% Asian, 0.1% Pacific Islander, 2.6% from other races, and 2.5% from two or more races. Hispanic or Latino of any race were 5.7% of the population.

There were 787 households, of which 34.4% had children under the age of 18 living with them, 43.6% were married couples living together, 15.1% had a female householder with no husband present, 7.2% had a male householder with no wife present, and 34.1% were non-families. 25.7% of all households were made up of individuals, and 4.3% had someone living alone who was 65 years of age or older. The average household size was 2.60 and the average family size was 3.13.

The median age in the city was 34.6 years. 25.5% of residents were under the age of 18; 9.8% were between the ages of 18 and 24; 28.9% were from 25 to 44; 29.1% were from 45 to 64; and 6.5% were 65 years of age or older. The gender makeup of the city was 52.0% male and 48.0% female.

2000 census
As of the census of 2000, there were 2,214 people, 847 households, and 553 families living in the city. The racial makeup of the city was 93.36% White, 1.49% African American, 0.95% Native American, 1.36% Asian, 0.09% Pacific Islander, 0.99% from other races, and 1.76% from two or more races. Hispanic or Latino of any race were 2.53% of the population.

There were 847 households, out of which 37.3% had children under the age of 18 living with them, 44.2% were married couples living together, 14.9% had a female householder with no husband present, and 34.6% were non-families. 27.0% of all households were made up of individuals, and 5.7% had someone living alone who was 65 years of age or older.  The average household size was 2.61 and the average family size was 3.15.

In the city, the population was spread out, with 29.2% under the age of 18, 9.9% from 18 to 24, 36.9% from 25 to 44, 18.6% from 45 to 64, and 5.5% who were 65 years of age or older.  The median age was 32 years. For every 100 females, there were 110.5 males.  For every 100 females age 18 and over, there were 112.9 males.

The median income for a household in the city was $41,618, and the median income for a family was $48,047. Males had a median income of $35,903 versus $27,147 for females. The per capita income for the city was $18,944.  About 9.6% of families and 10.7% of the population were below the poverty line, including 15.0% of those under age 18 and 12.4% of those age 65 or over.

References

External links
 Lexington, MN – Official City Website

Cities in Anoka County, Minnesota
Cities in Minnesota